Labuha is a small port town on the eastern Indonesian island of Pulau Bacan. It is the capital of the South Halmahera Regency, part of the province of North Maluku, and also the administrative centre of the Bacan District within the regency. It has a population at the 2020 Census of 13,546 (including the adjoining urban communes of Amasing Kota, Amasing Kota Barat and Amasing Kota Utara). The town is served by Labuha Airport.

Climate
Labuha has a tropical rainforest climate (Af) with moderate to heavy rainfall year-round.

References

Populated places in North Maluku
Regency seats of North Maluku